The 1924 City of London by-election was a parliamentary by-election held on 1 February 1924 for the British House of Commons constituency of City of London, which covered the "Square Mile" which was the United Kingdom's traditional financial district.

The seat had become vacant on the elevation to the peerage of one of the constituency's two Conservative Members of Parliament (MPs), Sir Frederick Banbury, as Baron Banbury of Southam.

Banbury had held the seat since a 1906 by-election, following his defeat at Peckham in the 1906 general election. He had represented Peckham since 1892.

Candidates 
The Conservative Party selected as its candidate Sir Vansittart Bowater, who had been Lord Mayor of London in 1913. He had stood as an Independent Conservative in the 1922 by-election.

The Liberal Party selected Henry Bell, who was a managing director of Lloyds Bank. This was the first time the Liberals had contested the City since the January 1910 election.

Results 
Bowater was comfortably elected, and would represent the constituency until his death in 1938, precipitating another by-election.

Votes

See also
 List of United Kingdom by-elections
 City of London constituency
 1922 City of London by-election
 1935 City of London by-election
 1938 City of London by-election
 1940 City of London by-election
 1945 City of London by-election

References

 

1924 elections in the United Kingdom
1924 in London
City of London,1924
1924